Chawki Bentayeb (born 1 May 1962) is an Algerian footballer. He played in five matches for the Algeria national football team in 1985 and 1988. He was also named in Algeria's squad for the 1988 African Cup of Nations tournament.

References

External links
 

1962 births
Living people
Algerian footballers
Algeria international footballers
1988 African Cup of Nations players
Place of birth missing (living people)
Association football forwards
21st-century Algerian people
ASO Chlef players
WA Mostaganem players